"First I Look At the Purse" (G7044) is a 1965 song recorded by R&B group the Contours on Motown Records' Gordy label. It was written by Miracles members Smokey Robinson and Bobby Rogers, the authors of the Temptations' first hit single, "The Way You Do the Things You Do".

Background
"First I Look at the Purse" was the last Contours hit featuring original lead Billy Gordon. It also features the renewed line-up of Contours, as several original members had left back in 1964. Shortly after its release, Gordon departed the group, and Motown, due to personal problems. He was replaced with Joe Stubbs, brother of lead singer of fellow Motown group the Four Tops, Levi Stubbs.
In the early 2000s, the Contours performed the song on the PBS special Motown: The Early Years. They still sing it in their live shows today. It has also appeared in several Contours' Motown "Greatest Hits" CD compilations.

Chart performance
"First I Look at the Purse" reached #57 on the Billboard Hot 100, and the Top 20 on Billboard's Hot Rhythm & Blues Singles chart, peaking at #12.

Credits
 Lead vocal by Billy Gordon
 Backing vocals by Sylvester Potts, Council Gay, and Jerry Green
 Spoken intro by Bobby Rogers (of the Miracles)
 Guitar by Huey Davis
 Other instrumentation by the Funk Brothers

Cover versions
This song is the opening track on The J. Geils Band's 1972 album Live Full House and their 1970  album The J. Geils Band.

References

The Contours songs
The J. Geils Band songs
Motown singles
1965 songs
Songs written by Smokey Robinson
Songs written by Bobby Rogers
Song recordings produced by Smokey Robinson
Gordy Records singles